Rashid Alhassan may refer to:
 Rashid Alhassan (footballer, born 1998)
 Rashid Alhassan (footballer, born 2000)